Expose This is the solo debut by Gioia, a member of Exposé. The album includes the two Top 40 Hot Dance Music/Club Play hits, "Be Mine" (which reached #40) and "Incredible".

"I Was Made For Loving You" is a Kiss cover.

Track listing

Critical response
Billboard gave a generally favorable review, praising its "energetic pop sensibilities" but criticising "Until the End of Time" as "trite" and saying it and her Kiss cover "I Was Made For Loving You" "miss the mark". About.com gave it 4/5, praising her songwriting as well as performance.

References

2004 albums
Pop albums by American artists